The Saudi ambassador in Tehran is the official representative of the Government in Riyadh to the Government of the Iran.

List of representatives

References

Iran–Saudi Arabia relations
Ambassadors of Saudi Arabia to Iran
Iran
Saudi Arabia